Sphingopyxis baekryungensis is a Gram-negative, slightly halophilic and motile bacterium from the genus of Sphingopyxis which has been isolated from seawater from the Yellow Sea in Korea.

References

Sphingomonadales
Bacteria described in 2005